Schottenstein Center, Ohio 2005 is a live album by Bruce Springsteen, released in September 2015. It was the seventh official release through the Bruce Springsteen Archives. The show was originally recorded live at the Schottenstein Center in Columbus, Ohio on July 31, 2005 during the Devils & Dust Tour.

The concert is available on CD and digital download at http://live.brucespringsteen.net.

Track listing
All songs by Bruce Springsteen, except as noted.

Set One
"Lift Me Up" - 5:31
"Reason to Believe" - 5:50
"Devils & Dust" - 4:33
"Lonesome Day" - 5:02
"Long Time Comin'" - 5:05
"Back in Your Arms" - 4:50
"For You" - 5:41
"State Trooper" - 4:18
"Cynthia" - 5:24
"One Step Up" - 4:36
"Reno" - 4:30 
"When You're Alone" - 4:15
"Valentine's Day" - 4:36
"Lost in the Flood" - 5:34
"The Rising" - 5:09
"Further On (Up the Road)" - 7:43
"Jesus Was an Only Son" - 4:22
"Two Hearts" - 4:39
"The Hitter" - 6:28
"Matamoros Banks" - 6:46

Encore
"Ramrod" - 4:20
"Bobby Jean" - 4:52
"The Promised Land" - 8:25
"Dream Baby Dream" - 8:33  
Originally Written and Recorded by Suicide

Personnel
Bruce Springsteen – Vocals, Acoustic Guitar, 12 String Acoustic Guitar, Electric Guitar, Harmonica, Wurlitzer Electric Piano, Acoustic Piano
Allan Fitzgerald - Keyboard accompaniment (off stage)

References

2015 live albums
Bruce Springsteen Archives